Hronov is a town in Náchod District in the Hradec Králové Region of the Czech Republic. It has about 6,000 inhabitants. It is known as the birthplace of writer Alois Jirásek.

Administrative parts

Villages of Malá Čermná, Rokytník, Velký Dřevíč, Žabokrky and Zbečník are administrative parts of Hronov. Malá Čermná forms an exclave of the municipal territory.

Geography
The Malá Čermná exclave lies on the border with Poland. Most of the municipal territory lies in the Broumov Highlands, but the southern part with the town proper lies in the Podorlická Uplands.

Hronov is situated on the river Metuje. The Zbečník Stream flows through the western part of the territory and joins the Metuje in the urban area. In Hronov there are Hronovka and Regnerka mineral springs.

History
The first written mention of Hronov is from 1359. It was founded during the colonization of this territory between 1241 and 1285. In 1415, Hronov is referred to as a market town. Until 1848, it was part of the Náchod domain. In 1859, it was promoted to a town.

Until 1918, the Hronow – Hronov town was a part of the Austrian monarchy (Austria side after the compromise of 1867), in the Nachod (Náchod) District, one of the 94 Bezirkshauptmannschaften in Bohemia.

In 1949, the neighbouring municipalities of Velké Poříčí, Zbečník, Velký Dřevíč, Rokytník and Žabokrky were merged with Hronov. In 1960, Malá Čermná joined Hronov. In 1990, Velké Poříčí became a separate municipality.

Demographics

Transport
Hronov lies on the railway line leading from Hradec Králové to Broumov.

There is the pedestrian border crossing with Poland Malá Čermná / Czermna.

Culture
The Jiráskův Hronov festival of amateur theatre takes place here every year. The festival is named after the significant Czech writer and local native Alois Jirásek.

Sights

The landmark of the town centre is the theatre which bears the name of Alois Jirásek. It was opened in 1930. The birthplace of Jirásek is a house from the 18th century and is a preserved example of folk architecture.

The oldest monument in Hronov is the Church of All Saints. The originally Gothic church was baroque rebuilt in 1713–1717 and 1736. The late Renaissance bell tower was built in 1610.

Notable people
Alois Jirásek (1851–1930), writer, author of historical novels and plays
Paula Gans (1883–1941), painter
Josef Čapek (1887–1945), painter, writer and poet
Egon Hostovský (1908–1973), writer, editor and journalist

Twin towns – sister cities

Hronov is twinned with:
 Bielawa, Poland
 Kudowa-Zdrój, Poland
 Nowa Ruda (rural gmina), Poland
 Warrington, England, United Kingdom

References

External links

 
Cities and towns in the Czech Republic
Populated places in Náchod District